Kolyady is a rural locality (a village) in Zabolotskoye Rural Settlement, Permsky District, Perm Krai, Russia. The population was 7 as of 2010. There is 1 street.

Geography 
Kolyady is located 47 km southwest of Perm (the district's administrative centre) by road. Trukhinyata is the nearest rural locality.

References 

Rural localities in Permsky District